The 2008–09 Akron Zips men's basketball team represented the University of Akron in the 2008–09 NCAA Division I men's basketball season. The Zips, led by head coach Keith Dambrot, played their home games at Rhodes Arena in Akron, Ohio, as members of the Mid-American Conference. The Zips won the 2009 MAC tournament to earn an automatic bid to the NCAA tournament as the 13th seed in the South region. Akron lost its first-round game in the tournament to Gonzaga, 77–64.

Roster 

Source

Schedule and results

|-
!colspan=12 style=|Exhibition

|-
!colspan=12 style=|Regular season

|-
!colspan=12 style=| MAC tournament

|-
!colspan=12 style=| NCAA tournament

Source

References

Akron Zips men's basketball seasons
Akron
Akron
Akron Zips men's basketball
Akron Zips men's basketball